The 1967 Major League Baseball draft (or "first-year player draft") recruits amateur baseball players into the American Major League Baseball league. The players selected in 1967 included many talented prospects who later had careers in the professional league. Some selections included Bobby Grich and Don Baylor (Baltimore), Vida Blue (Kansas City Athletics), Dusty Baker and Ralph Garr (Atlanta), Ken Singleton and Jon Matlack (Mets), and Ted Simmons and Jerry Reuss (St. Louis). In the January draft, Boston selected catcher Carlton Fisk and the New York Mets drafted Ken Singleton. The Cincinnati Reds selected Chris Chambliss in the 31st round only to have him enroll in junior college. The Mets chose Dan Pastorini in the 32nd round, but Pastorini chose football and played several seasons in the NFL. Atlanta also chose Archie Manning in the 43rd round.

First round selections

The following are the first round picks in the 1967 Major League Baseball draft.

Other notable selections

* Did not sign

Notes

External links 
Complete draft list from The Baseball Cube database

Major League Baseball draft
Draft